Philip Anthony-Rodriguez (born March 10, 1968) is an American actor known for his roles on Jake 2.0 as Kyle Duarte, the voice of disc jockey Maurice Chavez in the 2002 video game Grand Theft Auto: Vice City, and as Jetstream Sam in the 2013 video game Metal Gear Rising: Revengeance.

Early life
Anthony-Rodriguez was born March 10, 1968, to Puerto Rican parents Maximo and Veronica (née Burgos) in Brooklyn, New York City. The youngest of five children, he began acting, singing, and doing voices when he was very little. At age 11, he started working with Acting by Children, a young people's performing group in New York City founded by Jeanne Niederlitz. As a result of his talent and look, the management group Niederlitz and Steele signed him and began representing him in talent auditions. Philip began working almost immediately and has been a busy working actor for over four decades. Raised in a bilingual household has enabled Philip to work in the business in both English and Spanish.

Career
In November 1990, Philip originated the role of Ritchie Valens in the musical Buddy: The Buddy Holly Story. He provided the voice of the male version of protagonist SPARTAN-B312 in the 2010 video game Halo: Reach. He is the voice of Jetstream Sam in Metal Gear Rising: Revengeance. He also played Dr. Evans in Madea's Big Happy Family. He recurred for six seasons as Ruben Enriquez in the ABC Family television series The Secret Life of the American Teenager. He played Nelson in film The Ode and had a guest role on the Disney Channel show Hannah Montana in 2009 and played Michael Grant in Castle in 2010. In 2011, he guest-starred on the Disney Channel show Shake It Up (season 1, episode 18: "Model It Up") as designer Napoleon Fontaine and in 2013 on Modern Family in the episode "The Big Game", and in 2014 as Mr. Eloquence on Real Husbands of Hollywood. Anthony-Rodriguez voices the role of Nick Mendoza in the video game Battlefield Hardline. In 2015, he was announced as the voice of the Imperial Inquisitor, the Fifth Brother on the Disney XD animated series Star Wars Rebels.

Filmography

Film

Television

Video games

References

External links
 

Living people
American male film actors
American male television actors
American male video game actors
American male voice actors
Male actors from New York City
People from Brooklyn
21st-century American male actors
Year of birth missing (living people)